Khani Chahar Bagh  is the most northerly district in Faryab province. The main village, Chahar Bagh , is in the southern part of the district. In the north the district's border is with Turkmenistan. The population in 2013 was estimated at 70,000. Ethnic composition includes 25% Turkmen and 75% Uzbek.

References

External links 
 District Profile UNHCR, July 2002
 Map of Settlements IMMAP, 2011

Districts of Faryab Province